Lüchun County is located in Honghe Hani and Yi Autonomous Prefecture, in the south of Yunnan province, China, bordering Vietnam's Lai Châu Province to the south.

Administrative divisions
In the present, Lüchun County has 4 towns and 5 townships. 
4 towns

5 townships

Ethnic groups
The Lüchun County Gazetteer (1992) lists the following ethnic Hani subgroups  (highlighted in bold) and their respective locations.
Ha'ou 哈欧
Daxing 大兴: Chanong 岔弄, Laobian 老边, Mazong 马宗
Sanmeng 三猛区: Tongzhu 桐珠, Hade 哈德
Qidi 期弟, Asong 阿松
Niukong 牛孔, Dashuigou 大水沟, Daheishan 大黑山
Guozuo 果作
Pinghe District 平河区: Cheli 车里, Xinzhai 新寨, Dongha 东哈, Zedong 则东 (townships 乡)
Biyue 碧约, Kaduo 卡多, Ximoluo 西摩洛
Niukong 牛孔, Daheishan 大黑山, Banpo 半坡, Qimaba 骑马坝 (districts 区)
Baihong 白宏
Dashuigou District 大水沟区

Ethnic Yi subgroups (all of which speak Southern Yi language varieties according to Lüchun 1992) and their respective locations are:
Achang 阿常
Niukong 牛孔
Pulian 普连
Qimaba 骑马坝, Daxing 大兴, Gekui 戈奎
Alu 阿鲁
Dashuigou 大水沟

The Luoluopo 倮倮颇 (lo33 lo55 pho21) or Luopo 倮颇 (lo55 pho21) are found in Luopan Shangzhai 罗盘上寨, Jinping County and in Zhongzhai 中寨, Dashuigou 大水沟 Township, Lüchun County. The Luopo of Jinping believe that their ancestors had migrated from Pu'er and Mojiang County, while the Luopo of Lüchun believe that their ancestors had migrated from Dali.

Climate

References

Lüchun County Gazetteer Editorial Committee (ed). 1992. Lüchun County Gazetteer 绿春县志. Kunming: Yunnan People's Press 云南民族出版社.

External links
Lüchun County Official Website

 
County-level divisions of Honghe Prefecture